Sojitra is one of the 182 Legislative Assembly constituencies of Gujarat state in India. It is part of Anand district.

List of segments
This assembly seat represents the following segments

 Sojitra Taluka - Balinta, Dali, Devataj, Kasor, Limbali, Palol, Piplav, Virol, Runjal, Kothavi, Isnav, Bantwa, Dabhou, Deva Talpad, Gada
 Tarapur Taluka - Dugari, Fatepura, Chikhaliya, Gorad, Jalla, Khada, Malpur, Mota, Tol, Varsada, Adruj, Changada
 Petlad Taluka (Part) Villages – Silvai, Amod, Shekhadi, Pandoli, Nar, Sansej, Ramodadi, Manpura, Manej, Khadana, Kaniya, Danteli, Bhurakui, Sundara, Dhairyapura, Vadadala, Dharmaj

Members of Legislative Assembly
2007 - Rohit Ambalal Ashabhai, Bharatiya Janata Party
2012 - Punambhai Madhabhai Parmar, Indian National Congress

Election results

2022

2017

2012

See also
 List of constituencies of Gujarat Legislative Assembly
 Gujarat Legislative Assembly

References

External links
 

Assembly constituencies of Gujarat
Anand district